The 1933–34 SK Rapid Wien season was the 36th season in club history.

Squad

Squad and statistics

Squad statistics

Fixtures and results

League

Cup

Mitropa Cup

References

1933-34 Rapid Wien Season
Rapid